Horace Edwin Jarnigan (August 23, 1909 – November 1977) was an American Negro league outfielder in the 1930s.

A native of Knoxville, Tennessee, Jarnigan played for the Homestead Grays in 1934. In five recorded games, he posted two hits in 13 plate appearances. Jarnigan died in New Kensington, Pennsylvania in 1977 at age 68.

References

External links
Baseball statistics and player information from Baseball-Reference Black Baseball Stats and Seamheads

1909 births
1977 deaths
Date of death missing
Homestead Grays players
20th-century African-American sportspeople